The Vajolet towers are six summits in the Dolomites in Val di Fassa, Italy.

References 
 Heinz Mariacher: Alpenvereinsführer Dolomiten Rosengartengruppe, Bergverlag Rudolf Rother, Munich, 1988.

External links 

 Close view on the Vajolet Towers

Mountains of the Alps
Mountains of South Tyrol
Dolomites